Cornelis Droochsloot (1640–after 1673) was a Dutch Golden Age painter.

Biography
Droochsloot was born and died in Utrecht.  According to the RKD he was the son and pupil of Joost Cornelisz Droochsloot and is known for genre works, landscapes and farm scenes.

References

Cornelis Droochsloot on Artnet

External links

1640 births
17th-century deaths
Dutch Golden Age painters
Dutch male painters
Artists from Utrecht